The 1974 Ottawa Rough Riders finished in 2nd place in the Eastern Conference with a 7–9 record. Head coach Jack Gotta left the Rough Riders to become the head coach of the Birmingham Americans in the World Football League.

Preseason

Regular season

Standings

Schedule

Postseason

Player stats

Passing

Rushing

Awards and honours
 Dick Adams, Defensive Back, CFL All-Star
 Jerry Campbell, Linebacker, CFL All-Star
 Al Marcelin, Defensive Back, CFL All-Star
 Rudy Sims, Defensive Tackle, CFL All-Star
 Legendary Rough Riders quarterback Russ Jackson was inducted into the Canadian Football Hall of Fame

References

Ottawa Rough Riders seasons
1974 Canadian Football League season by team